Pavel Aleksandrovich Kulizhnikov (born 20 April 1994) is a Russian speed skater. He won the men's 500 metres event at the 2015 World Single Distance Championships as well as the 2015 World Sprint Championships, becoming the youngest winner since speed skating icon Eric Heiden of the United States. In 2015, he became the first speed skater to finish the 500-meter in under 34 seconds with a world record of 33.98. In 2020 he became the first speed skater to break 1:06 in the 1000 metres. At the 2016 World Single Distance Championships, Kulizhnikov won the men's 500 m and 1000 m, becoming the first man to win gold in both distances at the same speed skating World Single Distances Championships.

Career

Junior
Kulizhnikov was a talented junior and prodigy, winning numerous of the Junior World Cup in the 2010–2011 and 2011–2012 seasons. At the 2012 World Junior Championships in Obihiro, Japan, then 17-year-old Kulizhnikov won gold in the 1000 meters and bronze in the 500 meters, but was later disqualified for a doping violation, with his results annulled, and suspended for two years ending his quest to compete at the 2014 Sochi Olympics. Kulizhnikov stated that methylhexanamine was found in his body because of a nasal spray for colds.

Senior

2014–15
After a two-year doping suspension, Kulizhnikov debuted in his first World Cup series in 2014–2015; he started his competition in Obihiro by taking gold in 1000 meters and silver in 500 meters. He won a total of 3 gold at the 2014–15 World Cup men's 1000 meters and 8 gold in 2014–15 World Cup men's 500 metres. He won gold at the 2015 World Single Distance Championships in 500 meters, as well as the 2015 World Sprint Championships, 18 years later since the last Russian Sergey Klevchenya won Sprint. He is also the youngest speed skater to win since speed skating Icon Eric Heiden of the United States. Kulizhnikov withdrew from the last leg of the World Cup series of the season nursing a back injury, his teammate Ruslan Murashov won the final event of the series in 500 meters in Erfurt, Germany. Kulizhnikov took 1st place in the overall ranking in the men's speed skating for 500 m and 1000 m in the 2014–15 World Cup Series. He underwent back treatment in the first half of the season.

2015–16
For the 2015–16 season, Kulizhnikov competed at the 2015–16 ISU Speed Skating World Cup in Calgary, winning the 500 m with a new Russian record of 34.11. He then won silver in 1000 m, updating his record to 1:07.33. On 15 November 2015, Kulizhnikov broke the world record in men's 500 m, clocking a time of 34.00 seconds to beat the previous record of 34.03 set by Jeremy Wotherspoon of Canada in 2007. Five days later at the second World Cup meet in Salt Lake City on 20 November 2015, he improved his world record to 33.98. He then won the men's 1000 m with an updated personal best of 1:06.70. Kuliznikov withdrew from the list in competition at the 2015–16 ISU World Cup in Inzell because of the flu.

He returned to competition at the 2015–16 World Cup in Heerenveen, where he won gold medals in 500 m and 1000 m in a time of 1:08.16 (a track record, and a lowland world record). On the third day of competition in 500 m race, Kulizhnikov unexpectedly fell in the inner corner in his mid-race and finished 20th, teammate Ruslan Murashov won the event. Kulizhnikov was unharmed from the fall and did not suffer any major injuries. In 29–31 January, Kulizhnikov competed at the ISU World Cup in Stavanger winning the gold medals in 500 m and in 1000 m, where he updated his new Lowland world record time of 1:08.10. On 11–14 February, at the 2016 World Single Distance Speed Skating Championships in Kolomna, Kulizhnikov won two gold medals, winning the men's 500 m and 1000 m, becoming the first man to win gold in both distances at the same speed skating World Single Distances Championships. In 26–28 February, Kulizhnikov retained his Sprint title winning the 2016 World Sprint Speed Skating Championships held in Seoul, South Korea.

Meldonium case
On 8 March 2016, it was reported that Kulizhnikov had failed a drug test, testing positive for meldonium, an anti-ischemic drug added to the World Anti-Doping Agency (WADA)'s banned substances list in 2016. On 13 April, the World Anti-Doping Agency gave amnesty to athletes with the presence of less than one microgram of meldonium in blood. Doping samples in tests conducted on athletes before 1 March 2016 with abnormal levels of the drug are acceptable, WADA cited due to uncertainties and lack of studies for how long meldoniumnstays in the body. On 21 April 2016, the International Skating Union lifted its temporary ban on Kulizhnikov, and he was reinstated in the team since the concentration of meldonium was below the threshold.

The International Skating Union's Official Statement was quoted: "In the case of Meldonium, the WADA recognized that there is currently a lack of clear scientific information on excretion time and considers that in certain circumstances there may be grounds for no fault or negligence on the part of the athlete.
All mentioned skaters credibly assured the ISU that they had discontinued the use of Meldonium before 1 January 2016, when the substance was included in the prohibited list. In light of the given information, the ISU has decided to lift the provisional suspension imposed on the four skaters, with immediate effect, to stay the results management process and consequently not to disqualify any results at the present stage."

2019–20
In the 2019–20 World Cup season, Kulizhnikov missed out on the first two stages due to an injury received during practice. He then skipped the following stage in Nur-Sultan. He returned to the ice rink in Nagano, collecting four medals, two of which were gold ones: in the 1000 m and, for the first time, in the team sprint. In the 1000 m event, he set a track record. In the following Calgary stage, he set another track record in the same event.

Kulizhnikov entered the 2020 World Single Distances Championships, taking place at Utah Olympic Oval in Salt Lake City. During the team sprint event, Kulizhnikov tumbled, so his team did not finish the run. The fall resulted in Kulizhnikov having his shoulders dislocated. However, the Russian took part in the 500 m distance and achieved victory. After the 500 m, he planned to skip the 1000 m event. Despite that, Kulizhnikov was persuaded not to do that; as a result, he finished the 1000 m event with a new world record (1:05.69).

Personal records

World records

Achievements
 Second-youngest world champion since Eric Heiden of the United States.
 First male speed skater to win 500m and 1000m gold at the same speed skating World Single Distances Championships.

Tournament overview

World Cup results

Podiums

Awards
Won the 2020 edition of the national sports award Pride of Russia, in the nomination Sportsman of the Year

References

External links

1994 births
Russian male speed skaters
Russian sportspeople in doping cases
Doping cases in speed skating
People from Kolomna
People from Vorkuta
Living people
World Single Distances Speed Skating Championships medalists
World Sprint Speed Skating Championships medalists
Sportspeople from the Komi Republic
Speed skaters at the 2022 Winter Olympics
Olympic speed skaters of Russia